Lambton Quay (once known as The Beach) is the heart of the central business district of Wellington, the capital city of New Zealand. 

Originally, as the name implies, it was the high-water line of the foreshore, and sometimes the sea would roll across the road and enter the shops on the opposite side.  It was the site of the original European settlement in 1840 (following initial settlement on flood-prone land at Petone), which grew into Wellington.  In the 19th century Pipitea Pa was situated at the extreme northern end of Lambton Quay – the section of road in this area is now known as Thorndon Quay. Land uplift caused by the 1855 Wairarapa earthquake and further reclamation have left Lambton Quay some 250 metres from the current shoreline.  Kumototo Stream used to flow from the Terrace, down what is now Woodward Street and across Lambton Quay to the waterfront. This stream was culverted in the late 19th century.

Lambton Quay is named after John Lambton, 1st Earl of Durham, the first chairman of directors of the New Zealand Company. 

Lambton Quay, Willis Street, Manners Street and Courtenay Place form what is known locally as the Golden Mile. The city's retail trade has spread further south to also include Cuba Street, but Lambton Quay remains a major commercial thoroughfare. In 2020 it was estimated that about 70,000 people travel on Lambton Quay and Willis Street each day, mostly on foot or by bus. It is also of administrative significance, with the New Zealand Parliament Buildings towards the northern end. The Wellington Cenotaph is also located at this end, next to Parliament. 

The Wellington Cable Car runs from Lambton Quay to the top of the Botanic Garden. James Henry Marriott, who arrived from London in 1843, had a bookshop here.

The length of Lambton Quay is punctuated by several notable sculptures.

History 

Dense bush, down to the harbour's edge, covered much of the area until 1840 and, at the site of the Old Bank Arcade, it could be hard to get round the rocks at high tide at what was then Windy Point, or Clay Point. The Point was dug away between 1857 and 1863 to reclaim 7 acres 3 roods 34 perches (almost ). 

The name Lambton Quay was in use by the end of 1840. On 22 October 1840 Barrett's Hotel, a 2-storey pub, opened at the north end of the Quay. The Wellington Hotel opened by 1843. Its owner, Baron Alzdorf, was the only Wellington person killed in the 1855 earthquake, when a chimney of the hotel fell on him, after which it became the Criterion Hotel, a name it kept until at least 1887. By 1900 buildings on the Quay included the Royal Hotel, government printer, Old Government Buildings, Central Police Station, Club Hotel, Occidental Hotel, Commercial Union and New Zealand Insurance companies, Trust & Loan Co, Star Hotel, Baker Bros, Union Bank of Australia, Bank of New South Wales, South British Insurance, Colonial Bank, Exchange Building, Barrett's Hotel and Equitable Building Investment Co.

References

External links
Lambton Quay online

Streets in Wellington City 
Shopping districts and streets in New Zealand
Wellington Central, Wellington